Angelo tra la folla ("Angel in the Crowd") is a 1950 Italian film directed by Leonardo de Mitri.

The protagonist of the film is Angelo Maggio, the first Afro-Italian child actor to establish himself in post-war Italian cinema, after the experience of the little Somali-Italian Ali Ibrahim Sidali in fascist colonial cinema. Abandoned at birth, Angelo had been adopted by the actor Dante Maggio and had already signalled himself in the film Il mulatto (1950) in the role of a black boy struggling with the prejudices of his environment.

Plot 
Angelo is a mulatto orphan child, raised in Ciampino in a nuns' institute. One day he gets on a van that takes him to Rome. After a series of meetings, he is helped by Sora Rosa, a fruit seller, who takes him to her house. While Angelo remains alone at home, a murder is committed in the neighbouring apartment, of which he is the only witness. The police unjustly accuse Pietro, son of Sora Rosa, of the murder. The child escapes and is hit by a car, driven by the owner of an appointment house; when the police arrive, the little one continues to flee until the real killer is arrested.

Cast
	 ... 	Angelo
Umberto Spadaro	... 	La Spada
Isa Pola	... 	Countess Melitta
Luisella Beghi	... 	Sister Luisa
Lia Murano... 	Ninuccia
Aldo Capacci	... 	Pietro
	... 	Bruno
Maria Parisi	... 	Sora Rosa
Ugo De Pascale	... 	Goldstein
Desiderio Nobile	... 	Blumfield
Silvio Bagolini	... 	Cavaliere Bartolozzi
Oscar Andriani	... 	Cmdr. Petroni
Anna Silena	... 	Sister Beatrice
Edoardo Toniolo	... 	Flores
Giovanna Galletti	... 	Giocatrice
Lora Silvani	... 	a waitress

Greta Mandrà
Clelia Matania
Melia Mataura
Diego Pozzetto

Adalberto Romi
Diana Veneziani
Ettore Vincelli

References

External links 
 
 Angelo tra la folla at Variety Distribution

1950 films
Italian black-and-white films
1950s Italian-language films
Italian drama films
1950 drama films
1950s Italian films